Wizards Presents: Worlds and Monsters is an accessory released as a preview for the 4th edition of the Dungeons & Dragons fantasy role-playing game, published in January 2008.  It is the second book in the series following Wizards Presents: Races and Classes.

Contents
Wizards Presents: Worlds and Monsters is a behind-the-curtain glimpse into the making of the 4th edition of the Dungeons & Dragons roleplaying game. The book contains essays and asides from the game's designers, developers, and editors, and explores some of the D&D game's most iconic locations and monsters.

Publication history
Wizards Presents: Worlds and Monsters was published by Wizards of the Coast, edited by Jennifer Clarke Wilkes, and written by Richard Baker, Logan Bonner, Andy Collins, Bruce R. Cordell, Rob Heinsoo, David Noonan, Christopher Perkins, Matthew Sernett, Chris Sims, and James Wyatt.

Shannon Appelcline commented that because Dungeons & Dragons Fourth Edition was published in the 21st century, more is known about that edition of the game  than about almost any other roleplaying game, and "A lot of that is thanks to a pair of books published by Wizards, Wizards Presents: Races and Classes (2007) and Wizards Presents: Worlds and Monsters (2007). These discussions of 4e's design helped to build interest in the upcoming release and they also contributed to Wizard's final year of third-edition publication, when they were loathe to publish any actual game books. However, interviews, blogs, journals, tweets, forum posts and just about every other sort of high-tech information dispersal available to the modern world have supplemented those books."

Reception

References

Dungeons & Dragons sourcebooks
Role-playing game supplements introduced in 2007